The 2007 European Amateur Team Championship took place 3–7 July at Western Gailes Golf Club in Irvine, Scotland, United Kingdom. It was the 25th men's golf European Amateur Team Championship.

Venue 
The club was founded in 1897. Its 18 hole links course on the Ayrshire coast in Irvine, North Ayrshire, 50 kilometres south west of the city center of Glasgow, was ready in 1899 and remained largely unmodified from its original layout. It is situated closely north of Royal Troon Golf Club and Prestwick Golf Club.

Format 
Each team consisted of 6 players, playing two rounds of stroke-play over two days, counting the five best scores each day for each team.

The eight best teams formed flight A, in knock-out match-play over the next three days. The teams were seeded based on their positions after the stroke play. The first placed team were drawn to play the quarter final against the eight placed team, the second against the seventh, the third against the sixth and the fourth against the fifth. Teams were allowed to use six players during the team matches, selecting four of them in the two morning foursome games and five players in to the afternoon single games. Teams knocked out after the quarter finals played one foursome game and four single games in each of their remaining matches. Games all square at the 18th hole were declared halved, if the team match was already decided.

The eight teams placed 9–16 in the qualification stroke-play formed flight B, to play similar knock-out play, with one foursome game and four single games in each match, to decide their final positions.

The four teams placed 17–20 formed flight C, to play each other in a round-robin system, with one foursome game and four single games in each match, to decide their final positions.

Teams 
20 nation teams contested the event, the same number of teams as at the previous event two years earlier. Turkey took part for the first time. Each team consisted of six players.

Players in the leading teams

Other participating teams

Winners 
Defending champions and nine-time-winners team England won the opening 36-hole competition, with a 7-under-par score of 703. Tied five strokes behind were host nation Scotland and team France. Scotland earned 2nd place on the tiebreaking better non-counting scores.

There was no official award for the lowest individual score, but individual leaders were Kevin McAlpine, Scotland, Rory McIlroy, Ireland and Paul Waring, England, each with a 6-under-par score of 136, two strokes ahead of Jesper Kennegård, Sweden, and Morten Ørum Madsen, Denmark.

Team Ireland won the gold medal, earning their fifth title and first since 1987, beating team France in the final 4–2. The winning Irish team, combined from the Republic of Ireland and Northern Ireland, included two future professional major winners, 18-year-old Rory McIlroy and 20-year-old Shane Lowry.

Team Scotland, earned the bronze on third place, after beating neighbor nation England 4–3 in the bronze match.

Results 
Qualification round

Team standings

* Note: In the event of a tie the order was determined by the best total of the two non-counting scores of the two rounds.

Individual leaders

 Note: There was no official award for the lowest individual scores.

Flight A

Bracket

Final games

* Note: Game declared halved, since team match already decided.

Flight B

Bracket

Flight C

First round

Second round

Third round

Final standings

Sources:

See also 
 European Golf Association – Organizer of European amateur golf championships
 Eisenhower Trophy – biennial world amateur team golf championship for men organized by the International Golf Federation.
 European Ladies' Team Championship – European amateur team golf championship for women organised by the European Golf Association.

References

External links 
 European Golf Association: Full results

European Amateur Team Championship
Golf tournaments in Scotland
European Amateur Team Championship
European Amateur Team Championship
European Amateur Team Championship